The Northwest Conference men's basketball tournament is the annual conference basketball championship tournament for the NCAA Division III Northwest Conference. The tournament has been held annually since 1994. It is a single-elimination tournament and seeding is based on regular season records.

The winner, declared conference champion, receives the NWC's automatic bid to the NCAA Men's Division III Basketball Championship.

Results

Championship records

References

NCAA Division III men's basketball conference tournaments
Basketball Tournament, Men's
Recurring sporting events established in 1994